Gryllica picta is a species of beetle in the family Cerambycidae. It was described by Pascoe in 1858. It is known from Argentina and Brazil.

References

Calliini
Beetles described in 1858